Lorretta "Lori" Chow (born 10 July 1988) is a Hong Kong-Canadian fashion model, actress and singer active in the Hong Kong entertainment industry. She was the second runner-up at the 2007 Miss Hong Kong Pageant and a former managed TVB artist. She released her debut single, "Discreet" (不失禮) in August 2013.

In 2015, she was picked to be a contestant on the third season of Asia's Next Top Model.

Filmography

Singing

Lori won the Fairchild TV New Talent Singing Awards Vancouver Audition in 2005 and represented Vancouver at the New Talent Singing Awards International Championship that year and garnered the "Most Trendy Image Award". She sang the ending theme song, "You Are My Angel" for Forensic Heroes II.

Lori has also participated in the Composers and Authors Society of Hong Kong (CASH) Song Writers Quest in both 2009, 2010 and 2012 as an Artist Singer. She was an Artist Singer for 風的期待 in 2009 which was awarded 2nd runners up, for 癡呆 in 2010, and 假使有日被忘記 which was awarded 1st runner up in 2012.

Awards
2005 New Talent Singing Awards Vancouver Audition–Winner
2005 TVB8 International Chinese New Talent Singing Championship–Best Image Award
2007 Miss Hong Kong Pageant–Second runner-up
2007 Miss Hong Kong Pageant–Most Attractive Legs Award

References

External links
TVB Miss Hong Kong
Official TVB Artiste Blog

 	 

|-
! colspan="3" style="background: #DAA520;" | Miss Hong Kong

1988 births
Living people
Actresses from Vancouver
Canadian people of Hong Kong descent
Hong Kong film actresses
Hong Kong television actresses
Hong Kong female models
Musicians from Vancouver
TVB actors
Top Model contestants
21st-century Hong Kong women singers
Canadian-born Hong Kong artists